The Gouden Spike is the most important athletics prize in Belgium, first awarded in 1954. 

Until 1987, the prize was alternated between track and field disciplines to tha athlete with the best performance of the last two years among the athletes who never won the prize; because it was only possible to win the prize once. Since 1974, for the first time also an award for female athletes was added.

Since 1988 the best male and female athlete and also the best male and female Belgian young talent of the year are elected. From that year on, in the main categories there is also an award for the second and third place (respectively called Zilveren Spike and Bronzen Spike).

This Belgian athletics prize is not to be confused with the award given at the Gouden Spike competition held annually in Leiden, Netherlands.

Winners

Athlete with best performance

Best athlete

References

Winners list
SPIKE D’OR GOUDEN SPIKE. Belgian Athletics. Retrieved 2020-03-19.

Athletics in Belgium
Sport of athletics awards
Awards established in 1989